Erkut Kızılırmak (born 14 September 1969) is an auto racing driver from Turkey. He started racing in rallying in 1992 and switched to touring cars in 2002, at the age of 32. In 2005 he won the Turkish Touring Car Championship, in a Vauxhall Astra Coupé formerly raced by Yvan Muller in the BTCC. He also made an appearance in the Turkish round of the World Touring Car Championship in 2005 driving an ex works SEAT Toledo for the GR Asia team alongside Tom Coronel.His connections with the series and the Triple 8 Race Engineering company, increased in 2006, with Erkut becoming the first Turkish driver to compete in the BTCC when he raced at Croft in a BTC-T Vauxhall Astra Sport Hatch, converted from one of the team's show cars. He also competed at Snetterton, where he achieved his best result - 13th.
On 9 February 2007 Erkut announced that he would be competing in the full BTCC championship in 2007, in an ex VX Racing Astra Sport Hatch. His Arkas Team unites with Tech-Speed Motorsport to run the car. 

Two tenth-places in the high-attrition round 8 at Brands Hatch gave him his only 2 overall points of the season, while he finished 9th in the Independents' Cup, showing some speed and gusto in a 2006-spec car.

Erkut also won the first two races of the 2007 Turkish Touring Car Championship.

In 2008 he returned for another season in the BTCC. This time as part of a two car team alongside Martyn Bell with the renamed Team Arkas Racing with Sunshine.co.uk. His best result of the year was a tenth place finish in round six at Rockingham Speedway, giving him his one championship point of the year.

Racing record

World Touring Car Championship
(key) (Races in bold indicate pole position) (Races in italics indicate fastest lap)

British Touring Car Championship
(key) (Races in bold indicate pole position - 1 point awarded in first race) (Races in italics indicate fastest lap - 1 point awarded all races) (* signifies that driver lead race for at least one lap - 1 point awarded all races)

External links
Profile on btcc.net
btcc:action Profile
Profile at BTCCPages.com

1969 births
Living people
Turkish racing drivers
British Touring Car Championship drivers
World Touring Car Championship drivers
Turkish rally drivers